The Xiuguluan River is the eighth-longest river in Taiwan with a total length of . It is located in the southeastern part of the island. It flows through the Huadong Valley  before emptying into the Pacific Ocean in Fengbin, Hualien.

Overview
The river originates on the eastern side of Mabolasi Mountain (on the border with Taitung County) and flows through Xiuguluan Mountain. It is the largest river in eastern Taiwan. Over 30 species of fish have been found in the river.

Rafting
The river is known for its many rapids and has become a prime destination for rafting, especially on a  section from Rueisuei Bridge to the Changhong Bridge.

Tributaries
There are five major tributaries, listed here from mouth to source:
Fuyuan River – Hualien County – 28 km
Hongye River – Hualien County – 16 km
Fengping River – Hualien County – 19 km
Lakulaku River – Hualien County – 54 km

See also
List of rivers in Taiwan

References

Rivers of Taiwan
Landforms of Hualien County